Moses Lim (born 12 December 1949) is a Singaporean actor, television host, comedian and food connoisseur, best known for playing Tan Ah Teck in the Singaporean sitcom Under One Roof (1995 - 2003).

Early life and education
Lim was born in Singapore to a businessman and housewife. He has one brother and two sisters.

Of the Chinese Henghua dialect group, Lim grew up speaking Hokkien at home. He learned English and Mandarin from his neighbours. He could also speak some Tamil and many other Chinese dialects.

Lim took his primary school education at Catholic High School, secondary school education at Maris Stella High School and Pre-University education at Anglican High School. He later studied commerce at the Ngee Ann Polytechnic.

Career

Media
Lim started learning crosstalk at the age of eight from a priest, who had come from Harbin, China at his primary school, Catholic High School. During the early 1970s, Lim performed crosstalk at his first television appearance. While working at other jobs, Lim would take on freelance entertainment jobs with the radio stations and occasionally made a few television crosstalk appearances.

Lim joined the Singaporean sitcom Under One Roof (1995 - 2003). Lim's famous tagline from Under One Roof is: "This reminds me of a story." For his effort in Under One Roof, Lim became the first Singaporean actor to win an award at the Asian Television Awards for Best Male Actor in a Comedy. 

Robert Chua, a Hong Kong producer, took note of Lim's success and invited Lim to Hong Kong to work. According to Lim, who was considered a part time actor with Television Corporation of Singapore (TCS), TCS tried to get him to sign a contract as a full time artiste which he declined due to disagreement on how management worked at TCS. Lim also claimed TCS tried to persuade him to sign a contract not to work overseas which he declined also and which he claimed rejected in TCS blacklisting him from any work with TCS.

Lim also starred in the Okto television series Zero Hero as Grandpa Magnificent. He played Eric Tan in the Singaporean film Just Follow Law (2007). He performed at the 2012 stage play, Happily Ever Laughter.

Gourmet
Lim's gourmet career started in 1993, when a film agency asked him to host a thematic gourmet tour, to which Lim agreed. He is the founder and manager of the Moses Lim Gourmet Club, which organizes gourmet tours on a bi-annually basis. Lim also serves as brand ambassador for Singaporean porridge restaurant Zhen Zhou Dao, which is run by his son-in-law and eldest daughter. Zhen Zhou Dao eventually closes after just a year of operations.

Other
In 1975, Lim's father died of a heart attack and Lim joined the automotive spare parts import-export firm which his father co-owned. Lim eventually started his own spare parts trading company.

Lim serves as chairman for a bridal store and a real estate company. Lim left the entertainment industry and hence he was not nominated for Top 10 Most Popular Male Artistes.

Personal life 
During one of his business trips while working for his own company, Lim met Monica. They got married in 1977 and have two daughters together.

Awards and nominations

References

External links
 
 

Living people
Singaporean male television actors
1950 births
Singaporean people of Henghua descent